Gordon James Klingenschmitt (born June 5, 1968) is an American evangelical activist, former U.S. Navy military chaplain, and politician. A Republican, he served one term in the Colorado House of Representatives for the 15th district from 2015 to 2017. Klingenschmitt unsuccessfully sought an at-large seat on the Colorado Springs, Colorado City Council in the 2019 election, losing to Wayne Williams.

Early life and education
Born in 1968 to a single mother in Buffalo, New York, he was adopted at age three by Joanne and Carl Klingenschmitt, Roman Catholics who had him baptized. He was raised in suburban Akron, New York.

Klingenschmitt earned a Bachelor of Arts degree in political science from the United States Air Force Academy, followed by a Master of Divinity, Master of Business Administration, and Doctor of Philosophy in theology from Regent University.

Career 
At the Air Force Academy, he attended a Pentecostal Bible study. Klingenschmitt says he was "born again" on December 13, 1986, stating that he "invited Jesus Christ to rule my heart in ways he had never previously done." He entered into active duty in the United States Air Force on May 29, 1991, and continued his service with the Air Force until September 2, 2002. He served in the United States Navy as a military chaplain.

Klingenschmitt ran for the 15th district seat in the Colorado House of Representatives in the 2014 elections. He received 70% of the vote in the general election to win the seat.

Court-martial
In March 2006, Klingenschmitt appeared in his Navy uniform at a political protest at Lafayette Square in front of the White House, alongside Roy Moore. He was subsequently court-martialed at Naval Station Norfolk and in September 2006 was found guilty by the jury of one misdemeanor count of disobeying a lawful order (Klingenschmitt had been instructed by his commanding officers not to appear at media or political events in uniform). The jury recommended that Klingenschmitt receive a reprimand and forfeit $3,000 in pay over a twelve-month period, although the jury also recommended that the forfeiture be suspended.

Klingenschmitt was subsequently ousted from the Navy and filed a lawsuit in the Court of Federal Claims, claiming that he was wrongfully discharged from the Navy and seeking reinstatement, and arguing that his First Amendment rights were violated.

The court rejected Klingenschmitt's claims, and held that the order issued to Klingenschmitt was properly "based on Navy regulations that prohibit the wearing of a uniform in connection with political activities" and "did not limit Dr. Klingenschmitt's right to engage in any religious practices (including presenting an opening prayer at the event or invoking the name of Jesus in his prayer)." The Court ruled that the order "simply prohibited Dr. Klingenschmitt from engaging in this activity while wearing his uniform at what was clearly a political event and not, as Dr. Klingenschmitt seems to suggest, a bona fide religious service."

2016 Colorado Senate election 
In 2016, Klingenschmitt did not seek re-election to his seat in the House but instead ran for the Colorado Senate in District 12. He lost in the primary to fellow Republican Bob Gardner, who went on to win the general election in November.

Political positions
During his time as a Navy chaplain, Klingenschmitt was "a vocal critic of the Navy's policies on prayer in ceremonial settings" engaging in "a long-running battle with the military over regulations requiring chaplains to deliver inclusive prayers at military events other than religious services." Klingenschmitt "accused his superiors of pressuring chaplains to offer generic, nonsectarian prayers" and as a result "gained wide attention and sympathy among religious conservatives."

During a 2012 appearance on The David Pakman Show, Klingenschmitt debated Jonathan Phelps, of the anti-gay Westboro Baptist Church.

Klingenschmitt is also known for his efforts to shut down the YouTube channel of one of his most vocal critics, Right Wing Watch, which uses video clips of his statements.

In 2012, Colorado attorney, businessman, and former Air Force officer Michael L. Weinstein, sued Klingenschmitt for issuing an imprecatory prayer that Weinstein claimed amounted to a fatwa. The suit was dismissed by the judge, ruling Weinstein had failed to connect the prayer to any subsequent threats or actions against him.

In 2014, Klingenschmitt wrote in an email that U.S. Representative Jared Polis (D-CO), who is openly gay, wanted to execute Christians; both political parties in Colorado disavowed Klingenschmitt, who then claimed his statement was "hyperbole".

In 2014, Klingenschmitt (then a Republican candidate for Colorado state representative in an eastern El Paso County district) frequently compared President Barack Obama to a demon, saying on one occasion that he was a "demon of tyranny" and was among "the domestic enemies of the Constitution." Klingenschmitt also asserted that "Obamacare causes cancer."

In March 2015, in response to an assault where a woman from Longmont, Colorado, had her 34-week-old fetus cut out of her womb, Klingenschmitt said the incident was evidence of the "curse of God" for abortion. Other Republicans denounced his comments. Despite Klingenschmitt's apology and recanting of the remarks, he was removed from the Health, Insurance and Environment Committee for two weeks. He voluntarily suspended his television ministry for six weeks.

In July 2015, Klingenschmitt responded to the Boy Scouts of America lifting their ban on gay scoutmasters by saying that this would lead to an increase in child molestation in the organization. The following month, Klingenschmitt reportedly stated that gays and pedophiles are influenced by different demons. In January 2017, he stated that gay men should be disqualified from teaching positions because of "their immorality."

Charity work
Klingenschmitt leads Pray In Jesus Name Ministries, which broadcasts PIJN News on NRB Network.

After a watchdog organization criticized Klingenschmitt for improper separation of profit and non-profit endeavors, Klingenschmitt allowed the Colorado Springs Gazette in 2016 to review certain Pray In Jesus Name Ministries financial documents. The newspaper found that the non-profit "spent almost all of its donations sending mailers and soliciting funds" but that Klingenschmitt "doesn't accept a salary or other compensation from the charity, and he appears to be keeping the finances separate from his for-profit entity."

References

1968 births
Living people
United States Navy chaplains
Discrimination against LGBT people in the United States
Republican Party members of the Colorado House of Representatives
United States Air Force Academy alumni
United States Air Force officers
Regent University alumni
People from Akron, New York
Politicians from Buffalo, New York
Politicians from Colorado Springs, Colorado
Converts to evangelical Christianity from Roman Catholicism
American conspiracy theorists
Christian fundamentalists
21st-century American politicians
Military personnel from Colorado